Trelawny Southern is a parliamentary constituency represented in the House of Representatives of the Jamaican Parliament. It elects one Member of Parliament (MP) by the first past the post system of election.  It was one of the 32 constituencies fixed in the new constitution granted to Jamaica in 1944. The constituency has featured in all 16 contested Parliamentary General Elections from 1944 to 2016. The current MP is Marisa Dalrymple-Philibert, representing the Jamaica Labour Party, who has been in office since 2007.

Boundaries 

The constituency covers four of the nine electoral divisions in the parish of Trelawny – Warsop to the west, Albert Town to the north, Ulster Spring to the north-east, and Lorrimers to the south.

Demographics

According to the Jamaica Population Census of 2011, the number of persons living in the constituency was 26,564, while the number of registered voters was 17,953. As of the 2020 general election, the number of registered electors in the constituency was 19,716. This represents a 2.2% increase over the 19,289 voters registered for the 2016 general election.

Members of Parliament

1944 to Present

Elections

Elections from 2000 to Present

See also
 Politics of Jamaica
 Elections in Jamaica

References

Parliamentary constituencies of Jamaica